Steinar Aspli (born 14 December 1957) is a Norwegian politician for the Centre Party.

He served as a deputy representative to the Norwegian Parliament from Nord-Trøndelag during the term 1997–2001. On the local level he is mayor of Nærøy municipality since 1999.

Since 2005 he is chairman of the board of the Nord-Trøndelag Health Trust. He succeeded Lars Peder Brekk.

References

1957 births
Living people
Deputy members of the Storting
Centre Party (Norway) politicians
Mayors of places in Nord-Trøndelag